The following are the list of programmes that are broadcast by Discovery Home & Health.

 A 
 A&E
 The A-List Diet
 Adoption Stories
 Aerobic Conditioning
 All Star Workouts
 Amazing Births

 B 
 Babes in the Wood
 Baby Days
 A Baby Story
 Baby Tales
 Baby's Room
 Berman & Berman
 Big Medicine
 BirthDay
 Body Spectacular
 Bringing Home Baby

 C 
 Catwalk Mums
 Celebrity Slimming
 Charm School
 Chicago Medical
 Cleanaholics
 Come Dine with Me
 Cover Shot
 Crash Test Mommy
 Critical Condition
 The Critical Hour

 D 
 A Dating Story
 Desperate Dieters
 Desperate Houses
 Dietbusters
 Downsize Me
 Dr. G: Medical Examiner
 Dr. Know
 The Dummies Guide - contains 4 "mini-programmes"; Dating, Marriage, Parenting and Pregnancy for Dummies
 Dwarf Stories

 E 
 Emergency
 Emergency Medics

 F 
 Face The Family
 Fat Academy
 Fat Doctor
 Fifty Stone Man...
 Fifty Stone Woman...
 Fixing Dinner
 From Here to Maternity

 H 
 Help Me to Speak
 Home Birth Diaries
 House of Babies
 How Clean is Your House?
 How to Live Longer
 Human Stories
 Homes Under The Hammer

 I 
 I'd Kill For A Baby

 K 
 Kitchen Crimes

 L 
 Lisa Williams: Life Among the Dead
 Little People, Big World
 Losing It: Tales From Fat Camp
 M 
 Make Room for Baby
 Maternity Ward
 Medical Miracles
 Mini Models
 A Model Life...
 Multiple Mums
 Mum + One
 Mums The Word
 My Big Foot...
 My Greek Kitchen

 N 
 Nanny School
 National Body Challenge

 P 
 Perfect Housewife
 Perfect Proposal
 A Place in the Sun
 Plastic Surgeons
 Plastic Surgery: Before and After
 Portland Babies
 Prison Doctors
 Purely Cosmetic

 R 
 The Real ER
 Rebuilt: The Human Body Shop
 Renovate My Wardrobe
 Rescue Mediums
 Resident Life
 Rich Bride Poor Bride
 Room 2B You

 S 
 Save Us From Our House!
 Sex Change
 Sex Tips For Girls Sextuplets Shalom in the Home Silicone Chicks Slimming Club Smooth Movers Strictly Dr. Drew Student Midwives Style By Jury Super Humans Supernanny Surviving Sextuplets and Twins T 
 Take Home Chef Test Tube Babies Texas Cheer Moms Things I Hate About You Til Debt Do Us Part Trauma Team Twins by Surrogacy Twins in Peril The Biggest Loser U 
 Untold Stories of the E.R. W 
 A Wedding Story What Men Want What Women Want When Surgical Tools... Who Rules the Roost Who'll Age Worst World's Fattest Kids... Y 
 Yorkhill Hospital Yummy Mummy''

Discovery Home and Health
Discovery